Jaan Lõo (6 February 1872 Holstre Parish, Viljandi County – 18 February 1939 Tallinn) was an Estonian Supreme Court judge, poet and politician. He was a member of Estonian Constituent Assembly. On 16 December 1919, he resigned his position and he was replaced by Harald Normak. His collection of poems Nägemised, published in 196, contains mainly patriotic poetry and verses of ancient traditions.

References

1872 births
1939 deaths
20th-century Estonian judges
Estonian male poets
20th-century Estonian poets
Members of the Estonian Constituent Assembly
University of Tartu alumni
People from Viljandi Parish